The 2020 All-Ireland Senior Football Championship was the 133rd edition of the Gaelic Athletic Association's premier inter-county Gaelic football tournament since its establishment in 1887.

The public health measures introduced to combat the COVID-19 pandemic resulted in the competition being delayed. On 17 March, the GAA confirmed that the opening fixture – due to have taken place at Gaelic Park in The Bronx on 3 May – had been postponed. In June, the GAA announced that the 2020 championship would be straight knock-out, the first straight-knockout since 2000.

Thirty teams took part – thirty of the thirty-two counties of Ireland. New York were unable to participate due to travel restrictions resulting from the COVID-19 pandemic. London were also eliminated from the 2020 All-Ireland championship after a meeting of the GAA's Ard Chomhairle on 12 September 2020. Sligo later withdrew due to a COVID-19 outbreak from 3 November.

London were initially scheduled to host Roscommon at Ruislip at the beginning of May, before all GAA activity was postponed due to the COVID-19 pandemic. Roscommon were then set to play their rescheduled Connacht football quarter-final on the weekend of 31 October, with the winner facing Mayo or Leitrim the following weekend. Roscommon advanced directly into the semi-final.

The Galway vs Sligo Connacht semi-final was not played as Sligo were affected by COVID-19 cases. Galway's first match was the Connacht final and the Connacht championship only had four teams instead of the usual seven. This previously only happened during the period when all Connacht finals were between Galway and Mayo (1933–1940).

It emerged that in order for London's quarter-final to take place their entire squad and backroom team would have had to self-isolate in Ireland for two weeks prior to the match. Kilkenny, as in previous years, did not enter.

In 2020 the GAA planned to introduce the Tailteann Cup, a second-tier championship for Division 3 and 4 National Football League teams who failed to reach their provincial finals or get promoted to Division 2 of the league. The Tailteann Cup was cancelled as a result of the impact of the COVID-19 pandemic on Gaelic games and was rescheduled for introduction in 2021, when its introduction was again postponed.

Defending champions Dublin completed an unprecedented six-in-a-row.

Competition format

Provincial Championships format
Connacht, Leinster, Munster and Ulster each organise a provincial championship. Most of the teams who lost a match in their provincial championship entered the All-Ireland qualifiers in the years prior to 2020 – New York did not enter the qualifiers. As the championship was delayed due to the impact of the COVID-19 pandemic, the qualifiers were abandoned with all matches being changed to straight knock-out.

If the score is level at the end of the normal seventy minutes, two periods of ten minutes each way are played. If the score is still level the tie is decided by a penalty shoot-out.

All-Ireland format
The four provincial champions compete in the semi-finals. If the score is level at the end of the normal seventy minutes in a semi-final, two periods of ten minutes each way are played. If the score is still level the semi-final is replayed. If the score is level at the end of the normal seventy minutes in the final, the match is replayed.

Rule changes from 2019 competition
Advanced Mark
Initially trialled in the 2019 Leagues, the advanced mark rule was introduced in 2020. The possibility of an advanced mark occurs when a player catches a ball cleanly on or inside a 45m line from a kick in play delivered by an attacking player on or beyond the opposition's 45m line that travels at least 20m and without touching the ground. The player who catches the ball, either an attacker or defender, can signal his intent to stop and take the free-kick resulting from the mark by raising an arm or play on immediately.

Sin-bin
A player who commits a black card offence is sent off the pitch to the sin-bin for ten minutes. Teams are not permitted to replace the player while he is in the sin-bin. If a player receives a  black card and has received a black or yellow card previously he is also given a red card.

Kick-out
Goalkeepers must take their kick-out from the 20 metre line (previously kick-outs were taken from the 13 metre line). The ball must be kicked forward and all players must be 13 metres from the ball until it has been kicked.

Following a motion proposed by Kildare at the GAA Congress on 28 September 2020, the kick-out rule was further modified so that an outfield player receiving a ball direct from the kick-out cannot play the ball back to their goalkeeper. Unusually, the "no back-pass" modification was not trialled before its introduction in the 2020 senior championship.

Provincial championships

Connacht Senior Football Championship

Leinster Senior Football Championship

Munster Senior Football Championship

The two teams who won the semi-finals in the previous year are given byes to this year's semi-finals.

Ulster Senior Football Championship

An un-seeded draw determined the fixtures for all nine teams. In April 2018, the Ulster GAA Competitions Control Committee introduced a rule that the two teams playing in the preliminary round would be exempt from playing in the preliminary round in the following two years. As a result of the draw for 2020, Cavan and Monaghan were awarded byes to the quarter-finals in 2021 and 2022.

All Ireland Series

Semi-finals

Final

Stadia and locations

Referees panel

Championship statistics
All scores correct as of 7 December 2020

Top scorer: overall

Top scorer: single game

Scoring events
Widest winning margin: 28
 Wicklow 0-07 – 7–14 Meath (Leinster SFC)
Most goals in a match: 8
Mayo 5–20 – 3–13 Tipperary (All-Ireland SFC semi-final)
Most points in a match: 36
Dublin 1–24 – 0–12 Cavan (All-Ireland SFC semi-final)
Offaly 0–16 – 0–20 Kildare (Leinster SFC)
Most goals by one team in a match: 7
Wicklow 0-07 – 7–14 Meath (Leinster SFC)
 Highest aggregate score: 57 points
Mayo 5–20 – 3–13 Tipperary (All-Ireland SFC semi-final)
Lowest aggregate score: 22 points
Cavan 0–13 – 0-09 Antrim (Ulster SFC)
Louth 1-07 – 1-09 Longford (Leinster SFC)

Miscellaneous
 Due to the COVID-19 pandemic, the All-Ireland Qualifiers and Super 8 Games were not played. 
 Sligo, London and New York withdrew from Connacht championship, meaning that only four teams competed for the first since 1952.
 London and New York of that year will be rescheduled for the 2025 season.
Kerry lost their only championship match, making it their first championship without a win since 1993. They had reached the quarter-final stage every year since its introduction in 2001.
 Dublin set a new record by becoming the first team to win six successive All-Irelands, and were also the first to win ten successive Leinster Championship titles.
Mayo also set a record: ten final defeats in a row (1989, 1996, 1997, 2004, 2006, 2012, 2013, 2016, 2017, 2020).
 Tipperary won their first Munster Championship title since 1935.
 Cavan won their first Ulster Championship title and reached the All-Ireland semi-final for the first time since 1997.
 The four provincial winners were exactly the same as the four provincial winners from 100 years earlier in 1920. Cavan also playing Dublin and Mayo also playing Tipperary, confirmed on the weekend of the centenary of Bloody Sunday due to the delay caused by the COVID-19 pandemic.
 Cillian O'Connor's four goals (accompanied by nine points) in the 2020 All-Ireland SFC semi-final at Croke Park broke the 5–3 record set by Johnny Joyce of Dublin in 1960 and matched with 3–9 by Rory Gallagher of Fermanagh in 2002 for the highest individual scorer in any championship football match.
 Dublin also scored the fastest goal in the history of the All Ireland final when Dean Rock netted after just 12 seconds.
 Dublin played five championship games en route to their All Ireland success without conceding a goal in all five matches, another impressive record.
 Dublin extended their record-breaking unbeaten streak to 42 consecutive championship games, as of 25 December 2020. This amounts to 39 wins, 3 draws and 0 losses.
 It was Dublin's first All Ireland championship win in a year ending in 0 and completed the set for them. They became the first football county since Kerry (1978) to do so.
 Mayo & Tipperary equal the record for the number of goals (8) in an All Ireland semifinal (1980 Kerry v Offaly).

Awards
All Star Team of the Year

 Player has previously been selected.

County breakdown
 Dublin = 9
 Cavan = 3
 Mayo = 2
 Tipperary = 1

Notes

References

External links
GAA official website
GAA 2020 Master Fixture

 
Gaelic games events postponed due to the COVID-19 pandemic